William Edward Augustus Pugh (known as Edward; 22 July 1909 – 4 January 1986) was the fifth Bishop of Penrith in the modern era.

He was educated at Leeds University and the College of the Resurrection, Mirfield. Ordained in 1934 he began his career with a curacy at Staveley, Derbyshire. From here he became Vicar of Norwell, Nottinghamshire and then Harrington, Cumbria along with his appointment as the first Archdeacon of West Cumberland. Appointment to the episcopate followed in 1970 – he was consecrated at York Minster on Michaelmas day (29 September) 1970 – and he retired nine years later.

References

1909 births
Alumni of the University of Leeds
Alumni of the College of the Resurrection
Archdeacons of West Cumberland
Bishops of Penrith
20th-century Church of England bishops
1986 deaths